Kikihia is a genus of cicada in the family Cicadidae. Most species contained in the genus are endemic to New Zealand, with a single Australian species (K. convicta) found on Norfolk Island. The genus was established in 1972 by John S. Dugdale with eleven species formerly classed within the genus Cicadetta.

Species
 Kikihia angusta (Walker, 1850)
 Kikihia cauta (Myers, 1921)
 Kikihia convicta (Distant, 1892)
 Kikihia cutora cumberi Fleming, 1973
 Kikihia cutora cutora (Walker, 1850)
 Kikihia cutora exulis (Hudson, 1950)
 Kikihia dugdalei Fleming, 1984
 Kikihia horologium Fleming, 1984 
 Kikihia laneorum Fleming, 1984 
 Kikihia longula (Hudson, 1950) 
 Kikihia muta muta (Fabricius, 1775)
 Kikihia muta pallida (Hudson, 1950)
 Kikihia ochrina (Walker, 1858) 
 Kikihia paxillulae Fleming, 1984 
 Kikihia rosea (Walker, 1850) 
 Kikihia scutellaris (Walker, 1850) 
 Kikihia subalpina (Hudson, 1891)

References

External links
 LandCare Terrestrial and Freshwater Biodiversity Information Systems information - cicadas 

Cicadas of New Zealand
Cicadettini
Cicadidae genera